The members of the 17th General Assembly of Newfoundland were elected in the Newfoundland general election held in November 1893. The general assembly sat from 1894 to 1897.

The Liberal Party led by William Whiteway formed the government. The Tory Party filed petitions against 15 Liberals including Whiteway and James Murray, an independent, alleging corrupt practices during the election; the results of those elections were set aside. The Tory Party temporarily held the majority and formed a government led by Augustus F. Goodridge in 1894. Following the by-elections, the Liberals regained the majority and formed a government led by Daniel J. Greene. After Whiteway won re-election in a by-election, he became Premier again.

George Emerson was chosen as speaker.

Sir Terence O'Brien served as colonial governor of Newfoundland until 1895, when he was replaced by Sir Herbert Harley Murray.

On December 8, 1894, London banks suspended credit to the Commercial Bank of Newfoundland and requested payment on some of its loans. The bank was unable to meet these obligations and requested its merchant customers to repay their loans; the merchants, themselves financially strapped, were unable to comply. On October 10, known as Black Monday, the Commercial Bank closed. This caused a run by customers on the two remaining banks, the Union Bank of Newfoundland and the Savings Bank of Newfoundland. The Savings Bank was able to cash a large cheque at the Union Bank, but the Union Bank was subsequently forced to close. Neither of the two closed banks would ever reopen. This resulted in the devaluation of Newfoundland's currency, the shutdown of many businesses and widespread unemployment in the colony. Early in 1895, banks from Canada opened branches in Newfoundland to fill the void. The value of the Newfoundland dollar was set to the same value as the Canadian dollar.

Members of the Assembly 
The following members were elected to the assembly in 1893:

Notes:

By-elections 
By-elections were held to replace members for various reasons:

Notes:

References 

Terms of the General Assembly of Newfoundland and Labrador